Hypotia numidalis is a species of snout moth in the genus Hypotia. It was described by George Hampson in 1900. It is found in Spain, Algeria and Syria.

The wingspan is about 30 mm. Adults are white, irrorated (sprinkled) with dark brown and fuscous.

References

Moths described in 1900
Hypotiini
Fauna of Mauritania